Rami Reddy or Ramireddy may refer to:

 Rami Reddy (actor) (1959–2011), Telugu film actor
 Duvvoori Ramireddy (1895–1947), Telugu writer
 Neelapu Rami Reddy (born 1965), Indian sprint athlete
 Vutukuru Rami Reddy (born 1918), Indian politician